A 2009 survey by the Pew Research Center estimated that 10-13% of Muslims worldwide adhere to Shia Islam, with a global total of between 154 million and 200 million Shia Muslims. In the Americas, Pew estimated a population of just under 4.6 million Muslims overall in 2009, with a small portion of those being Shia.

The Pew survey estimated a Shia population of 300,000 Shias in North America, about 10.0% of North America's Muslim population. Also, according to Shafaqna News agency, Shiite (Shia) Muslims are approximately 2.5 million persons in the U.S.

North America
A 2009 Pew survey estimated that around 300,000 Shias lived in North America (including the United States), about 10% of North America's Muslim population. American Shia Muslim community are from different part of the world such as South Asia, Europe, Middle East, and East Africa. They are mainly from Arab countries such as Iraq, Lebanon, as well as non-Arab countries such as Iran, Pakistan and others. The second group of Shiites are black and white Americans who have become Shiites in a variety of ways, including through Sufi propaganda. The population of Shiite Muslims in the United States is about 900,000, which is 15% of the total Muslim population in the country.

Those Shia Muslims have many activities and founded several organization such as Islamic Center of America and North American Shia Ithna-Asheri Muslim Communities Organization (NASIMCO).

The first group of immigrant Shiites migrated to the United States from Lebanon and Syria about one hundred and eighty years ago (1824-1878). These Shiite Muslims migrated to cities such as Detroit, Michigan, and Ross (California) and North Dakota.

In Brazil 
Brazil, a vast South American country, has approximately one million Shia Muslims from the time of the Ottoman Empire. Many Lebanese emigrants to Brazil resulted in an increase Shia beliefs. In Brazil, Shia Muslims generally live in an area known as Curitiba. They have many activities and have established several Islamic centers and institutes for the propagation of Shia beliefs and the message of Ahl al-Bayt. For this reason, there are several related places for Shia Muslims in Sao Paulo, such as the Prophet of Allah Muhammad mosque and the Imam Khomeini Islamic Center. Also, Shias have one mosque, Imam Ali mosque, where Shia and Sunni may pray together. In recent years, Shia and Sunni scholars have had several meetings with each other. Many Shia's books are translated into Portuguese such as Nahjul Balagha.

In Canada 
The population of Shiite (Shia) Muslims in Canada is approximately 300,000 people (who are including Twelvers/Ismailis), out of about 850,000 Muslims who are in the country. The majority of the mentioned—Shia—Muslims are Iranians, Pakistanis, Iraqis, Syrians, Lebanese, Indians, Afghans, Azeris; and are also from Tanzania, Kenya and Uganda.

There are more than 360 mosques and Islamic centers in Canada, 80 of which are owned by Shiite Muslims.

In Venezuela 
At the moment, Venezuela possesses 15 Islamic civic associations which are located in ten states. Arab immigrants, Venezuelans, and Creoles form Islam as a known tradition. The closest estimate of when Islam came to the country is “centuries ago.” The number of Muslim people in Venezuela estimates from 800,000 to approximately one million people.

Shia organizations in the Americas

 The Islamic Center of America is a Shia mosque in Dearborn, Michigan. It is the oldest Shia mosque in the United States and the largest in North America (founded in 1963). The institution known as "heart of Shiism" in the United States.
 North American Shia Ithna-Asheri Muslim Communities (NASIMCO) is a religious-cultural organization for Shia followers in the North of America. Islamic education board of the NASIMCO have investigated and standardized Shia books and also published several references in Shia history and theology.
 The Council of Shia Muslim Scholars was founded in North America in 1994 and is known as the central organization for Shia followers.
 The Al-Khoei foundation was established in the 1980s by Seyyid Abul Qasim Musawi Al-Khoei, Grand Ayatullah and scholar of Shia in New York.
 Al Baqee Organization is registered in 2003 in Illinois and is known as the central organization for leading initiatives and activism on the preservation and restoration of Islamic heritage globally.

Several other organizations and institutions are active in the Americas, including:

See also 

 Islam in the United States
 Islam in the Americas

References 

Americas
American Shia Muslims